Joseph G. Gavin Jr. (September 18, 1920 – October 30, 2010) was an American engineer responsible for the development of the lunar module used in the Apollo program, as well as president, chief operating officer and chairman of the executive committee of the Grumman Corporation.

Gavin was elected to the National Academy of Engineering in 1974 "for leadership in the design and the production of the Apollo Lunar Module".
Gavin was director of the Lunar Module program for Apollo. In that capacity he managed a team of 7,500 people that oversaw landing of the lunar module on the Sea of Tranquility on the moon, on July 20, 1969. 
Gavin was also critical to saving Apollo 13 mission. Gavin received NASA's Distinguished Public Service Medal in 1971 for his role in resolving the Apollo 13 crisis.
Gavin was also in charge of development of Orbiting Astronomical Observatory at Grumman.
Neil Armstrong (landed on the moon) called Gavin "highly regarded aerospace engineer".

Chronology 
 1920: born on September 18 in Somerville, Massachusetts 
 1937: graduated Boston Latin School
 1941: B.S. in aeronautical engineering, Massachusetts Institute of Technology
 1942: M.S. in aeronautical engineering, Massachusetts Institute of Technology
 1942–1946: officer with U.S. Navy
 1946–1985: career with Grumman
 1946: joined Grumman, a design engineer 
 1957: chief missile and space engineer at Grumman, in charge of development of Orbiting Astronomical Observatory
 1962-1972: Vice President and Director, Lunar Module Program, Project Apollo
 1974: elected to the National Academy of Engineering
 1976: president and Chief Operating Officer of Grumman
 1985: retirement from Grumman
 2010: died on October 30

References 

American aerospace engineers
1920 births
2010 deaths
Directors of Northrop Grumman
MIT School of Engineering alumni
Members of the United States National Academy of Engineering
People from Somerville, Massachusetts
United States Navy personnel of World War II
American chief operating officers